Kint or KINT may refer to:

People 
 Cor Kint (1920–2002), Dutch backstroke swimmer
 Magda Kint (born 1936), Belgian artist
 Marcel Kint (1914–2002), Belgian road bicycle racer
 Tõnis Kint (died 1991), Estonian politician
 Roger Kint (Keyser Söze), a character in the 1995 film The Usual Suspects

Other uses 
 KINT-TV, a television station (channel 26) licensed to El Paso, Texas, United States
 KINT-FM, a radio station (93.9 FM) licensed to El Paso, Texas, United States
 KINT-IRGT, the Belgian Royal Institute for the Sustainable Management of Natural Resources and the Promotion of Clean Technology
 The ICAO code for Smith Reynolds Airport in Winston-Salem, North Carolina, United States